The history of the relationship between imperial China and Tibet regime during the Tang dynasty and the Song dynasty is a diplomatic history between central China and Tibet.

Tang Dynasty 
Although some materials show that Tibet had long been established as a political entity, no concrete historical evidence was recorded before the end of the sixth century. In the late sixth century A.D, the leader of a tribe called Yalongxibuye in Shannan Prefecture of Tibet, Namri Songtsen, started  a unification war and conquered a tribe named Supi. Thereafter Songtsen Gambo, the son of Namri Songtsen, established a capital in Luoxie after defeating the Yangtong, Bailan, Dangxiang and Fuguo successively, building a strong Tibet kingdom, which made him the first person to successfully unite Tibet.

The Tang dynasty at the time was in its prime. In 630 A.D., Li Shimin, the second Tang emperor, was respectfully called "Heavenly King" by leaders in western China. Tang and Tibet started an unavoidable relationship in economy, politics and other areas.

Envoys sent by Songzain Gambo came to central China to pursue a friendly relationship with the Tangs in the eighth year of Zhenguan (the reign title of Li Shimin), i.e. 634 AD, and brought back Tang officials, who settled in Tibet. In 636 A.D, Songzan Gambo invaded Tuyuhun, a vassal country of Tang, on the pretext of blaming the declined of political marriage proposal by Tang to Tuyuhun. Tang entitled Hou Junji, the minister of the official personnel affairs department, to the Chief Administrator of Dangmi Vennue; Zhi shi Si-li, the Leading General of the Right, to the Chief Administer of Bailan Vennue; Niu Jinda, the military defense general of left, to the Chief Administer of Kuoshui Venue; Liu Jian, the Leading General of the Left, the Chief of Taohe Vennue, to lead the army of Tang to defend Tuyuhan. Songzan Gambo was frightened after being defeated by the spearhead of Tang led by Niu Jinda, and withdrew his army from Tuyuhun, Dang Xiang and Baiyuqiang before the arrival of the principal force led by Hou, and sent envoys to Tang to apologize for the attack .

First political marriage 
Songzan Gambo then decided to change the marriage proposal into a peaceful one after seeing the prosperity of Tang, and it is recorded that Songzan sent his chancellor, Lv Dong, to Tang with five thousand golds and hundreds of antique treasures to show his sincerity. Two years later, after receiving the third political marriage proposal made by the Geer Dongzanyusong, an envoy sent by Songtsen Gambo, the emperor of Tang selected a daughter from royal nobility to be the wife of Songzan Gambo and crowned her Princess Wencheng. What's more, the emperor of Tang appointed Li Daozong, the Minister of Rites and the Highness of Jiangxia, to convoy the Princess with a tally that symbolized the power of the Tang emperor to Tibet. Princess Wencheng entered Tibet in 641 A.D, and brought various production techniques of central China, including 60 books on manufacturing and construction techniques, over 100 remedies for  up to 404 illnesses, 5 methods of medical diagnosis, 6 medical devices and 4 medical weighty tomes, along with a myriad of living items and crop seeds, to Tibet. According to the classic of The New Book of the Tang Dynasty, Songtsen Gambo welcomed his bride in Baihai and Princess Wen-cheng lived in Tibet for nearly 40 years until she died in 680 AD. This was the first formal contact established between Tang and Tibet.

Tang and Tibet maintained a peaceful and friendly relationship when Songtsen Gambo was alive and the diplomatic communication increased gradually every year, making Tibet a transportation hub between Tang and Sindhu (now India). In 645 A.D, the emperor Li Shi-min returned to Chang'an, the capital of Tang, after conquering Goguryeo, and Songtsen Gambo immediately sent an envoy, Garl Donzawickson, to Chang-an to congratulate Li on his triumph with a gift of a seven-foot tall golden goose. Three years later, Wang Xuance, the Tang envoy who visited Sindhu, was looted, as Sindhu was in military disorder, and escaped to Tibet, where Songtsen Gambo dispatched armies and recruited soldiers from Nepal to assist Wang in suppressing the conflicts in Sindhu, safely bringing back the whole diplomatic mission along with hundreds of prisoners of war to Chang'an. The stone tablet of the Tang envoy who visited Sindhu is still kept in the Gilong town of Tibet, recording Wang's revisit to Sindhu bypassing Tibet in the third year of Xianqing (658A.D), the reign title of Emperor Gaozong. 

Emperor Li Shi-min passed away in the year of 649 A.D and the throne was then acceded by his son, Li Zhi, namely Emperor Gaozong. Li Zhi sent an envoy to Tibet with the news of his father's death and offer an honorary title of Groom martial supervisor and Highness of Xihai to Songtsen Gambo while Gambo in return sent a special representative to Chang'an to attend the funeral of Li Shimin, with a tribute of 15 gold, silver and jewelry, as well as congratulations and expressions of his support for Li Zhi. Zhangsun Wuji, the civil and administrative official, also received a diplomatic statement from Gambo saying that Tibet would not hesitate to send armies to help if there were any unfaithful officials in Tang who dared to threaten the authority of the emperor. Thereafter Li Zhi progressed Songzan Gambo's title to ‘the king of Cong’ and put a stone statue of Songzan Gambo before Zhao mausoleum, the mausoleum of Li Shimin.

Manglunmangzan, the grandson of Songtsen Gambo, took over his grandfather's crown in 650 A.D after Songtsen Gambo died. However, the actual executive power was in the hand of Geer Dongzanyusong, who continued Songtsen Gambo's political policy of improving and revising the law, checking family registration and implementing tax policy to ensure the inner stability of Tibet. He also availed himself of the inner turmoil in Tuyuhun, attacking it several times even at the risk of conflict with Tang, who had long supported Tuyuhun. After the death of Geer, his son (or perhaps his grandson), Lun Qinling, took control of Tibet. To support Tuyuhun, Tang convoyed the king of Tuyuhun, Murong nuohebo, back to his country in 670 A.D, with an army of over a hundred thousand soldiers, but encountered a Tibetan army of over 200 thousand soldiers deployed by Lun Qinling, and was defeated in the battle of Dafeichuan. From then on, Tibet strengthened its control over the western region of Qinghai Lake but lost a war with Tang for the eastern region of Qinghai Lake and four towns in Anxi.

The posthumous son of Manglunmangzan, Dusongmangbojie, became king of Tibet after his father's death in 676 A.D but the political power was still in the hand of Lun Qinling. As Dusongmangbojie grew up, from 695 A.D to 698 A.D, Lun's family was denounced and crusaded against for threatening the power and authority of the king, as well as conflicting with other noble families. Lun Qinling finally committed suicide in Zongke, Qinghai province after a rout in battle. Zan Po, brother of Lun, and his son Mang Buzhi, surrendered to Tang after their defeat and were respectively given the titles ‘Assisting general and Highness of GuiDe’ and ‘Marquis of Anguo’. Mang Bu-zhi progressed to Highness of Ba Chuan for outstanding contribution in war and his descendants all stayed in Tang to be Tang officials.

Second political marriage 
The kingship of Tibet kingdom, therefore, was strengthened. However, shortly after he eliminated the threat of Geer family, Dusongmangbojie died in a war to vanquish a region called Nanzhao, and his one-year-old son, Me agtsom, succeeded to the throne of Tibet under the help and supervision of his grandmother, Chi Ma-tou. With hope for peace and friendship as both Tang and Tibet at that time suffered the painful results of years of war, Chi Ma-tou sought a political marriage with Tang again for Me agtsom as she had once done for her son. Emperor Zhongzong agreed to the marriage proposal and sent Princess Jincheng along with a special gift of part of the Yellow River region (the region above Gui-de whose name was Tangmu town). This region later was retaken by Wang Zhongsi and Ge Shu-han in a later war that defeated Tibet in 710 A.D. The emperor himself led a group of Tang officials and saw Princess Jincheng off with a solemn farewell ceremony in Shiping town.

In 731 A.D, Me agtsom and Princess Jin-cheng dispatched an envoy to Tang to ask for ancient Chinese classics of Mao's Explanation on the Book of Songs, Books of Rites, and Spring and Autumn Annals, as well as seeking an open market and boundary division, with a statement from Me agtsom saying that Tang and Tibet were of the same family, as he was the distant nephew of the former emperor and was now the husband of Princess Jincheng, and therefore the people of both countries should enjoy a peaceful and joyful life. Tang and Tibet then established a monument in Chiling (now ‘sun and moon mountain’ in Qinghai province) as the boundary between the two countries. Frontier generals and officials from both countries attended the open market in Chiling and Gan Song-ling made an official announcement that prohibited robbery and attack, and to  maintain a friendly relationship.

However, wars still broke out shortly after as both Tang and Tibet wanted to expand their territory and power, and frontier generals wanted to seize more fame and military exploits. Military officers such as Li Wei, Zhang Shougui, Wang Zhongsi, Ge Shuhan defeated Tibet in the regions from east to west successively, making Tibet sue for peace for several times. In 754 A.D, the prime ministers of Tibet, Modongzebu and Langgese, rebelled and killed king Me agtsom. In 755 A.D, a 13-year-old new king, Thrisong Deutsen, took power. The same year, the cataclysmic An-Shi Rebellion broke out in Tang. Emperor Xuanzong fled from Chang'an to Sichuan and the deployment of Tang's army to suppress the rebellion gave Tibet the opportunity to occupy the Tang territories of Longyou, Hexi and four towns in Anxi.

In October of 763 A.D, they availed themselves of the opportunity created by discord between the emperor and Tang officials, and in addition the Shuofang army turned a blind eye on their aggression in the east, so Tibet occupied Chang'an with an army of 200 thousand soldiers, forcing Emperor Daizong to escape to Shanzhou, and selected Li Chenghong, brother of Princess Jincheng, as the new emperor. The Tibetan army withdrew after occupying Chang'an for 15 days on hearing that Tang's loyal army was marching toward the city.

Tibet kingdom expanded its territory to a great extent in the reign of Thrisong Deutsen. At that time, Tibet's eastern border with Tang was near Long Mountain. The Tibetan army even occupied Baoji once, threatening the safety of Chang-an. In the north Helan Mountain connected Huiqi, and they conquered Nanzhao in the southeast to be a tributary. In 790 A.D, Tibet occupied the four towns in Anxi and Beiting in the west and stretched its northern territory to the northern bank of the Ganges River in India, as historic Tibetan classics recorded.

Meeting Tablet of Tang and Tibet 
Historical materials show that Tang and Tibet officially met eight times from 705 A.D to 822 A.D, and the tablet of the eighth meeting still stands before the Jokhang Temple in Lhasa. The eighth meeting was also called "Changqing meeting" as it took place in the first and second year of Changqing (821 A.D to 822 A.D), the reign year of Tang emperor Muzong.

According to incomplete statistics, there had been up to 191 mutual communications between Tang and Tibet from the fourth year of Zhenguan (630 A.D), the reign name of emperor Taizong, to 842 A.D, including Tang officials entering Tibet 66 times and their counterparts entering Tang 125 times.

Tibet was haunted by the religious fight between the local religion, Bon, and the newcomer, Buddhism. In 841, Thrisong Deutsen was assassinated by an official who opposed Buddhism and his brother, Lang Darma, who belonged to the anti-Buddhism group, succeeded as king of Tibet. In 843 A.D, Lang Darma enacted a law banning Buddhism and then carried out a series of killings, closed Buddhist temples, forced the remaining Buddhists to secularize and destroyed hundreds of thousands of Buddha statues and classic Buddhist scriptures. This was called "Lang Darma destroying the Buddhism". In 846 A.D, Lang Darma was shot dead by a Buddhist monk called Lalongbeijiyundan and four years later Zhang Yi-chao from Tang dispelled Tibet in Gansu province, taking Hexi and Longyou under the control of Tang once more. After the death of Lang Darma, inner scrambles between the two sons of Lang Darma and melees between military officials broke out now and then. This anarchic situation lasted 20 years and triggered the rebellion of the citizens of Tibet in 869 A.D. In 877 A.D the insurrectionist army excavated and damaged the imperial mausoleum, killed the royal family and the aristocrats, and brought an end to the unification of Tibet that had lasted for 200 years. Thereafter Tibet's region splits in different tribes and parts while a similar situation happened in Tang. The Tang dynasty ended in 907 A.D, and central China entered into the Five Dynasties and Ten Kingdoms period and finally regained unification under the Song dynasty.

Song dynasty 
The earlier Song dynasty was established in 960 A.D. Although the military power of this new empire was not as strong as Tang had been, and it rarely contacted the Tibetan tribes of Ü-Tsang who dwelled far from the Han, it did keep in touch with Tibetan tribes living in Gansu, Qinghai and Yunnan province where Han people were also domiciled.

Not long after the establishment of the earlier Song dynasty, a Tibetan tribe leader named Gusiluo set up a regime in the Huangshui basin centered on Miaochuan (now Ledu) and Qingtang (now Xining) and defended it from an attack by the kingdom of Western Xia launched by its leader, Li Yuan-hao. The Gusiluo regime was the biggest and the first feudal Anduo regime led by Tibetan people at that time. The Gusiluo regime maintained a harmonious relationship with Song, sending envoys to pay tribute and ask for honorable official titles from Song. In 1032 A.D (the first year of Mingdao, the reign title of Emperor Renzong of Song), Emperor Renzong titled Gusiluo "Ningyuan General" and "defending militia leader in Aizhou", along with a generous salary. In 1041 A.D (the second year of Kangding), the emperor of Song formed an alliance with Gusiluo to combat the kingdom of Western Xia, and awarded Gusiluo another two official posts, "inspecting and supervising officer in Chongbaoshun" and "supply commissioner for Hexi army". Thereafter the descendants of Chio-ssi-lo, Dong zhan, E guo-gu, Xia zheng, Long za, Xi she-luo-sa, all accepted the honorable official title given by Song.

However, the relationship between the Chio-ssi-lo tribe and the earlier Song dynasty was not peaceful. After Wang An-shi became the Song prime minister, he changed the policy of allying with Chio-ssi-lo to combat the kingdom of Xixia into conquering Chio-ssi-lo as a springboard for attacking Xixia. In 1072 A.D, a military officer of Song, Wang Shao, led an army to attack Gusiluo, occupying the Xihe region that was once under the control of Chio-ssi-lo. This forced Chio-ssi-lo to cooperate with Xixia to attack Hezhou in Song. The frontier general of Hezhou was killed in this attack. In 1077 A.D, Song was forced to ally with Gusiluo again, elevating ing its king, Dongzhan, to ‘Highness of Wuwei’. In 1096 A.D, Song availed itself of the opportunity brought by inner melee that followed the takeover by a new king, Xiazheng, of the throne in 1099 A.D, and sent two generals, Wang han and Wang zhan, to assail Gusiluo, which forced Xia Zheng and his successor Long za to surrender to Song sequentially. However, Song failed to control that region and had to withdraw its army the following year, bestowing on the successor Xi she-luo-sa the title of ‘supply commissioner of Xiping army’ and the ‘head of Miaochuan’.

In 1103A.D, Song again defeated Xi she-luo-sa and established a puppet government there, annexing the entire territory of Chio-ssi-lo into Song in 1116 A.D. In 1134 A.D, the original territory of Chio-ssi-lo was occupied by another military power, the Jin, and the last leader, Zhao Huai-en, of Chio-ssi-lo fled to the Southern Song Dynasty (1127 A.D-1279 A.D).

In addition, Emperor Zhenzong of Song bestowed on another Tibetan leader, Pan Luozhi of Liu Gu tribe in Wuwei region, the title of ‘defending minister of Jianzhou and inspecting and supervising minister for the west part of Lingzhou’ in 1001 A.D (the fourth year of Xianping, the reign title of emperor Zhenzong)

The Song dynasty had long been carrying out the policy of ‘farming in the frontier region to supply the army’ in the south part of Gansu Province, Hexi corridor,  eastern Qinghai Province and northwest Sichuan Province that had been controlled by Tibet since the 11th century defense against the attack from Xixia, as well as improving its self-protecting power. Song had also exported weapons like bows and arrows to Tibetan tribes living in the Hexi corridor and recruited Tibetan archers into the militia system for mutual defense against the assaults of Xixia. The General Wang Shao, greatly exploited the land of Linxia and Lintao in Gansu province, recruiting up to 300 thousand Tibetans to do the ploughing. The renowned ‘Tea and Horse market’ was also promoted in some special markets opened by Song in regions of Yaan in Sichuan province, Linxia in Gansu province and Shanxi province, inaugurating the fixed trade of horse and tea that lasted for hundreds of years.

See also 
 The war between Tang and Tibet
 Tibetan Empire
 Tang dynasty
 Song dynasty

References 

Song dynasty
Politics of Tibet
History of Tibet
Tang–Tibet relations